Aberdeen International Airport  is an international airport, located in the Dyce suburb of Aberdeen, Scotland, approximately  northwest of Aberdeen city centre. A total of just under 3.1 million passengers used the airport in 2017, an increase of 4.6% compared with 2016.

The airport is owned and operated by AGS Airports which also owns and operates Glasgow and Southampton airports. It was previously owned and operated by Heathrow Airport Holdings (formerly known as BAA). Aberdeen Airport is a base for Eastern Airways and Loganair. The airport also serves as the main heliport for offshore North Sea oil and gas industry. With the utilisation of newer aircraft, helicopters can reach northernmost platforms on both the east and west of Shetland.

The airport has one main passenger terminal, serving all scheduled and charter holiday flights. In addition, there are four terminals dedicated to North Sea helicopter operations, used by Bristow Helicopters, CHC Helicopter, NHV and Babcock Mission Critical Services Offshore. There is also an additional small terminal adjacent to the main passenger terminal, used only for specific oil company charter flights to Sumburgh in Shetland.

History

Early years
The airport opened on 28 July 1934 as Dyce Aerodrome. It was established by Eric Gandar Dower for his other new enterprises including Aberdeen Flying School, Aberdeen Flying Club, and his airline, Aberdeen Airways.

During the Second World War the airfield became a Royal Air Force station known as RAF Dyce (Royal Air Force Dyce). It was the site of the Dyce Sector Operations Room within No. 13 Group RAF. Although fighter aircraft were based there throughout the Battle of Britain to provide protection from German bombing raids from Occupied Norway, it was mainly used as a photographic reconnaissance station. Anti-shipping operations by RAF Coastal Command were carried out from RAF Dyce as well as convoy escort. The airfield was bombed by the Luftwaffe on 26 July 1940 and 27 August 1940, however no damage was reported. A decoy site ('Q' Site) was located at Harestone Moss near Whitecairns. The aim of this site was to create the impression of an active airfield during the night. The decoy worked on around four occasions, where several raids resulted in bombs being dropped on the decoy site. The decoy site had a small underground bunker that housed a generator.  This was used to power a decoy 'flarepath' in addition to a rotating lamp to give the impression of a taxiing aircraft. Near the airport off the A96 road, to deter German gliders landing to attack RAF Dyce, the flat areas across from Concraig Farm (between Blackurn and Kintore) had wooden poles erected as anti-glider landing poles. A Supermarine Spitfire IIa crashed at the east side of the airfield on 19 November 1941 during attack practice with a target glider being towed. F/O Zaoral is buried in the old Dyce graveyard, where some German aircrew are also buried that crashed in Aberdeen in 1940. 

A significant wartime event occurred in May 1943 when a German Junkers Ju 88 night-fighter landed at Dyce; it was flown to Scotland by its crew, who wanted to defect to the Allies. The surrender of this aircraft was of great intelligence value at the time, as it was fitted with the latest FuG 202 Liechtenstein BC A.I radar. The aircraft survives and is displayed in the Royal Air Force Museum in London.

On 17 August 1943, a de Havilland Mosquito crashed following a stall in the circuit, crashing onto 5 John Street in Dyce village; another Mosquito on 10 April 1944 crashed on approach to the airfield. On 26 December 1944, A Messerschmitt Bf 109G signalling intentions to surrender crash landed at the airfield. On 16 May 1945, two pilots were killed when a Vickers Wellington bomber crashed on landing wrecking a goods train in Dyce railway station. During air-raids in the Second World War, aircraft were moved to East Fingask beside Oldmeldrum. One RAF building still remains at East Fingask, where aircrews waited for the "All Clear" before returning to Dyce airfield.

The following units have been based at Aberdeen Airport:

Post RAF use 

Virtually nothing remains from the war era at the airport due to expansion and development of the industrial estates around it. The original airport terminal was located at the east side where the Bond Offshore Helicopters Terminal 2 is located, a new terminal was built along with a new control tower to handle the increase in air traffic. The airport was nationalised in 1947 and was transferred to the control of the British Airports Authority (BAA) in 1975. From 1967 and 1970 there were regular flights to Moscow and Toronto; these were later stopped due to cost related problems.

With the discovery of North Sea oil, helicopter operations began in 1967, linking the growing number of oil platforms to the mainland. As Aberdeen became the largest oil-related centre in Europe, the airport became the world's largest commercial heliport. Today, Aberdeen Airport handles more than 37,000 rotary wing movements carrying around 468,000 passengers annually. Helicopters account for almost half of all aircraft movements at the airport.

Development since the 2000s

Until March 2005, aircraft were not allowed to take-off or land between 22:30 and 06:00 local time due to noise constraints. The city council overturned this curfew, however, despite some Dyce residents' objections, and the airport is now open 24 hours a day to fixed-wing aircraft with a quota count of QC4 or below, and the overnight restrictions still apply to helicopters.

General aviation flight training for private pilots licences takes place from the east side of the airport. Signature Flight Support also handles most of the private flights and corporate jets that park on the Eastside Apron. An air ambulance (fixed wing) is based on the eastside in a dedicated hangar, Gama Aviation operates the Super King-Air aircraft. There is an additional air ambulance Eurocopter EC135 helicopter based at the airport for use during daylight hours to attend emergency incidents.

Aberdeen, being a major city in the oil industry has a number of oil company charter flights, these have included flights to South America and also Korea (via Abu Dhabi). Flights from the USA are regular visitors as well as the occasional military or VVIP flight.

In May 2011, the Aberdeen airport gained direct connectivity to Central Asia. Azerbaijan Airlines commenced an Airbus A319 service to Baku, facilitating ties between the oil and gas businesses of the Scottish city and Azerbaijan. In October of the same year, a 124-metre extension to the main runway at the airport was opened, almost eight months ahead of schedule.

After less than two years of operation, Azerbaijan Airlines decided to conclude its Baku flight in October 2012, seeking to focus on its London route instead. On 8 January 2013, the airport was renamed Aberdeen International Airport.

In October 2014, Heathrow Airport Holdings reached an agreement to sell the airport, together with Southampton and Glasgow, to a consortium of Ferrovial and Macquarie Group for £1 billion. The airport handles around 500,000 passengers per year by helicopter for the North Sea oil fields. making it the world's busiest heliport.

A total of just under 3.1 million passengers used the airport in 2017, an increase of 4.6% compared with 2016. The airport's Master Plan 2013 forecast growth to 5.09 million passengers a year by 2040. A major three-year project (2016-2019) aims to transform the passenger terminal and increase space by 50%.

In 2019 the airport was ranked worst in Scotland and sixth worst in the UK by Which? magazine in a ranking of 30 airports for customer satisfaction, with a score of 50%. Edinburgh performed better on 61% while Glasgow International achieved the top rank in Scotland at 64%. In February, Easyjet announced that they will axe their Aberdeen to Gatwick service. In December 2020, easyJet announced that they would reverse this decision and would restart flights to Gatwick Airport in May 2021.

Airlines and destinations

Passenger
The following airlines operate regular scheduled flights to and from Aberdeen:

Cargo

Statistics

Passengers and movements

Busiest routes

Facilities

The main terminal has 19 stands adjacent to it. Remote parking is available on other aprons located around the airfield. Four offshore helicopter operators each have their own aprons and hangars, with Bristows and CHC-Scotia located on the western side of the airfield and NHV and Babcock on the eastern side.

Several hotels are situated adjacent to the airport, including Crowne Plaza, Holiday Inn Express, Courtyard by Marriott, Leonardo Inn, Moxy Hotel and Jurys Inn. Other nearby hotels include the Hallmark Hotel, Hampton by Hilton, Marriott, and Premier Inn.BMI Regional had its head office in Aberdeen Airport East.

For flight training, Airbus/Eurocopter and Bristow Helicopters both have helicopter flight simulators in buildings at the airport. Alexander Air also operate GA flight training based from Aberdeen Airport.

Accidents and incidents
On 22 May 1978, a British Airways Hawker Siddeley Trident (G-AWZU) overshot the runway ending up 200 ft into the grass at the northern end of runway 35 (now 34) due to wet weather. All 120 passengers survived with no injuries. The forward fuselage of this aircraft survives at the Jet Age Museum, Gloucester.
On 4 July 1983, Bristow Helicopters AS332L Super Puma (G-TIGD) crashed on landing at Aberdeen. During the approach from the North Hutton offshore platform, a loud bang was heard, followed by severe vibration. A distress call was made to air traffic control by the crew. Shortly before landing control was lost and the helicopter struck the runway heavily on its side. Ten of sixteen passengers received serious injuries. A tail boom panel had become detached in flight and damaged all five tail rotor blades. The resulting imbalance to the tail rotor assembly led to the separation of this unit and subsequent loss.
On 31 March 1992, BAe 146-300 (G-UKHP) overran runway 34 after landing during wet conditions with a high crosswind. The pilot failed to deploy the spoilers and ran off the end of the runway. The aircraft sustained only minor damage and no passengers were injured.
On 24 December 2002 a Swearingen Metroliner III (OY-BPH) of Danish operator North Flying crashed after takeoff from Aberdeen on a positioning flight to Aalborg in Denmark. Immediately after take-off the aircraft was suspected to have suffered a major power loss in its right engine and crashed into a field just to the south of the airport. It slid along the field and through a fence onto Dyce Drive, a main road into the airport, where it hit a moving car and then came to rest. The two crew and driver of the car survived the accident, with only one crewmember sustaining minor injuries.
On 22 June 2006, a City Star Airlines Dornier 328 (TF-CSB) operating a passenger flight from Stavanger, Norway, overshot the end of the airport's runway by several hundred yards as it came in to land. None of the 16 passengers and 3 crew members on board were injured.
On 16 June 2020, a former Flybe Bombardier Q400 (G-JECK) made a low speed rear end ground collision with a stationary Loganair Embraer ERJ-145EP (G-SAJS), the former becoming wedged under the latter. There were no passengers on either plane and no injuries.

Transport

Rail
The Aberdeen–Inverness railway line and Dyce railway station are located alongside the eastern boundary of the airport. As of July 2020 there is no scheduled bus service between the station and the main passenger terminal which is located on the western side of the airfield. Between 2012 and 2017 a shuttle bus (No. 80 Dyce Airlink) provided transport between the station and the terminal. The service ceased operation due to low passenger numbers, attributed by the operator to lower activity in the North Sea oil and gas industry.

Bus
Aberdeen Airport is served by local and express bus services operated by First Aberdeen and Stagecoach Bluebird. There is a dedicated Jet 727 bus service up to every 10 minutes to the main bus and rail station in central Aberdeen. 747 Aberdeen Airport–Peterhead links the airport with Balmedie, Ellon, and Peterhead.

On 5 August 2019, the new X27 bus service was introduced which connects Aberdeen City Centre, Dyce railway station, TECA (P&J Live) and the heliports which are around a 5-minute walk to the main terminal.

Road
The airport lies on the main A96 Aberdeen to Inverness road, being only a few kilometres from the city centre itself.

The airport is connected to the Aberdeen Western Peripheral Route at the Craibstone exit which is around 1 mile drive away from the Main terminal.

Future 
A range of proposals to better connect Dyce railway station to the main passenger terminal have been suggested over the years. A rail link between the two was ruled-out in 2019 as being too expensive, with an estimated cost in excess of £100 million. Options such as walking long distance travelators or covered walkways, bus services or fixed trams as well as the possibility of a railway station at nearby entertainment venue P&J Live are still being considered.

Notes

References

Citations

Bibliography

External links

 Official website
 

Transport in Aberdeen
Airports in Scotland
Airports established in 1934
Heathrow Airport Holdings
1934 establishments in Scotland